The 2017 season was Southern Vipers' second season, in which they competed in the Women's Cricket Super League, a Twenty20 competition. The side topped the group stage for the second year in a row, therefore progressing to the final. In the final, they faced Western Storm in a repeat of the previous season's final. This time, however, Western Storm were victorious by seven wickets with twelve balls to spare.

The side was captained by Charlotte Edwards and coached by Nicholas Denning. They played two of their home matches at the Rose Bowl and their other home match at the Arundel Castle Cricket Ground.

Squad
Southern Vipers announced a 15-player squad on 26 July 2017. Dane van Niekerk were originally signed as an overseas player, but was ruled out due to injury and replaced by Mignon du Preez. Age given is at the start of Southern Vipers' first match of the season (10 August 2017).

Women's Cricket Super League

Season standings

 Advanced to the Final.
 Advanced to the Semi-final.

League stage

Final

Statistics

Batting

Bowling

Fielding

Wicket-keeping

References

Southern Vipers seasons
2017 in English women's cricket